The Ural-5323 is an 8×8 heavy-duty off-road truck specially designed for army service. It has been produced since 1989 by the Ural Automotive Plant located in Miass, Russia.

The Ural-5323 is a platform for the Pantsir-S1 gun-missile Air Defense System.

The Ural-5323-20, with its 8x8 wheel configuration, is designed to carry cargo weighing up to 10 tons and tow trailers with a full weight up to 16 tons.

The military version differs from the civilian version as its headlights are located on the cab. Civilian versions are sold with headlights located in the bumper. 

Earlier versions were equipped with cabs from Kamaz, which complicated production and were less suitable than the replacement Iveco cabs which were provided after 2000.

Specifications
Units hermetization system
Remote tire pressure control. 
Payload: .
Drive: 8×8. 
Suspension: dependent, solid axles with leaf springs, rear  - solid axles on balance-cart. rear - solid axles on balance-cart. 
Engine: YaMZ-238B type - V8 turbo-diesel, ohv, displacement 14,866 cc (bore 5.12", stroke 5.51"). *Puts out  @ 2,000 rpm. 
Torque  @ 1,200...1,400 rpm. 
Gearbox: 8×2 speed, locking transaxle differential.
Top speed: . 
Wheelbase: 9'0.3"+4'7.1".
Cargo platform size: 18'7.8"×7'7.7"×.3'3.4". 
Maneuverability: turning circle 85.3', max. ascent angle 31 deg., hillside: 20 deg., ground clearance , overcome ford: , overcome trench 3'11". Brakes: drums, with air-hydraulic control. Full weight: , max. 
Towing weight: .
Fuel tanks: 79.3 + 55.5 gal.
Range: . 
Tyres: 14.00-20 146G. 
Pressure: controlled.

External links

 Ural-5323-20

Military trucks
Ural Automotive Plant trucks
Military vehicles introduced in the 1980s